The 2011 Women's Football Alliance season was the third season of the Women's Football Alliance (WFA), a league of 61 teams.  The regular season began on Saturday, April 2, and ended on Saturday, June 18.  After the playoffs, the season ended with the WFA Championship Game on Saturday, July 30 at Pennington Field in Bedford, Texas, home of the Dallas Diamonds and the defending champions from 2010, the Lone Star Mustangs. The championship was between the National Conference champ Boston Militia and the American Conference winner San Diego Surge, who are in their first year of play, and the Militia won the WFA title with a 34–19 over the Surge. It is the team's first Women's Football Alliance championship.

Regular Season Standings

National Conference

y - clinched division title

American Conference

y - clinched division title

Playoffs

National Conference

American Conference

Championship

External links
 Women's Football Alliance

Women's Football Alliance Season, 2011
Women's Football Alliance